The Rhode Island Bar Association (RIBAR or RIBA) is the unified (mandatory) bar association of the U.S. state of Rhode Island.

Organization
Founded in 1898, the Rhode Island Bar Association is a unified bar association with over 6,000 attorney members licensed to practice in Rhode Island. Bar Association membership and dues are mandatory, and Bar Association dues are in addition to licensing fees charged by the Rhode Island Supreme Court. The objectives of the Rhode Island Bar Association are to uphold and defend the Constitution and laws of the United States and the Constitution and laws of Rhode Island and to maintain representative, democratic government; to advance the science of jurisprudence; to promote the administration of justice; to uphold the honor and dignity of the process of law; to apply its knowledge and experience in the field of the law to the promotion of the public good; to encourage and cultivate social intercourse among the members of the Rhode Island Bar; and to cooperate with the American Bar Association, other national, regional and state bar associations and the local bar associations in the State of Rhode Island. The Rhode Island Bar Association's website at www.ribar.com  serves as a source of information and provides contact information for its attorney members, as well as for members of the public. On the Bar's website, For Attorneys highlights the Bar's many programs including: Continuing Legal Education (CLE) seminars, Lawyer Referral Service (LRS), Bar Committees and membership benefits. Members Only, provides a wealth of Bar members services including CASEMAKER, the 24/7, online, law library and OAR, the Bar's attorney-to-attorney information resource center. Attorney Directory includes all registered members’ contact information, and is accessible to all visitors to the Bar's website. For the Public contains valuable information to help choose a lawyer and find guidance on a range of legal issues, as well as law related education programs. Rhode Island Bar Foundation provides information about Interest on Lawyers Trust Accounts (IOLTA) and the Bar's Law School Scholarship Program.

Governance & Structure
A Bar President, who serves a one-year term from July 1 through June 30, three Officers of the Bar, an elected House of Delegates, which meets quarterly, and an executive committee, which meets monthly, govern the Association. The Association holds an Annual Meeting in June. In fulfilling its stated purposes, the Bar's programs and activities are designed to serve the needs and interests of the membership, the public and the administration of justice. Standing and special committees direct much of the programming of the Rhode Island Bar Association. Standing committees are created by the Bylaws for the investigation and study of matters relating to the accomplishment of the general purposes, and business of the Association. Committee members are appointed by the incoming Bar President and serve for one-year terms, which may be renewed. The Bar's Governance & Bylaws may be accessed here:
https://www.ribar.com/About%20the%20Bar%20Association/GovernanceAndByLaws.aspx

2022-2023 Rhode Island Bar Association Officers
 Mark B. Morse, Esq., President
 Nicole J. Benjamin, Esq., President-Elect
 Christopher S. Gontarz, Esq., Treasurer
 Patrick A. Guida, Esq., Secretary

The Rhode Island Bar Association is headquartered at the Rhode Island Law Center, 41 Sharpe Drive, Cranston, RI 02920. The Center provides a venue for a number of Association services, activities and meetings, houses the Bar staff, and available to members for meetings. Office hours are 8:30 am to 5:30 pm, weekdays. The Rhode Island Bar Association publishes the Rhode Island Bar Journal, a bi-monthly news magazine featuring articles and important information for members and those interested in Rhode Island law. Articles on current legal issues and news about the Association are in the Journal and available on the web site.

Bar Exam
All attorneys licensed to practice in the state belong to the Rhode Island Bar Association after passing the bar examination. As of 2012, the bar exam in Rhode Island tests knowledge of the common law through the Multistate Bar Exam and Multistate Essay Exam, and the exam tests Rhode Island law on the state essay portion. The exam also includes a practical component, the Multistate Performance Test. Applicants must also pass the MPRE ethics exam, pass a background check, and pay all necessary fees.

See also
Rhode Island Supreme Court

References

External links
Official website
RI bar exam information

American state bar associations
1898 establishments in Rhode Island
Rhode Island law
Organizations established in 1898